Calotarsa pallipes is a species of flat-footed flies (insects in the family Platypezidae).

References

Platypezidae
Articles created by Qbugbot
Insects described in 1866